These are the Billboard Hot 100 number-one hits of 1977.

That year, 18 acts earned their first number one songs, such as Leo Sayer, Rose Royce, Mary MacGregor, Manfred Mann's Earth Band, Daryl Hall and John Oates, ABBA, David Soul, Thelma Houston, Fleetwood Mac, Bill Conti, Alan O'Day, Shaun Cassidy, Andy Gibb, The Emotions, Meco, and Debby Boone. Marilyn McCoo and Billy Davis Jr., already having hit number one with The 5th Dimension, also earn their first number one song as solo acts. Leo Sayer, Stevie Wonder and The Eagles were the only acts to hit number one more than once with each having two songs.

Chart history

Number-one artists

See also
1977 in music
List of Cash Box Top 100 number-one singles of 1977

References

Sources
Fred Bronson's Billboard Book of Number 1 Hits, 5th Edition
Joel Whitburn's Top Pop Singles 1955-2008, 12 Edition
Joel Whitburn Presents the Billboard Hot 100 Charts: The Seventies
Additional information obtained can be verified within Billboard's online archive services and print editions of the magazine.

United States Hot 100
1977